Mohamed Ali Haidar (born in Lebanon on 20 July 1990) is a Lebanese-Canadian basketball player for the Sporting Al Riyadi Beirut of the Lebanese Basketball League .

Career
Haidar born in Qana, Lebanon to Mohammad and Mona Haidar. He has four brothers and two sisters. He immigrated with his family to Canada in 2006, where he studied at J.L. Forster Secondary School in Windsor, Ontario, playing starting 2006–2007 season in the high school's Forster Spartans basketball team.

Upon graduation from Forster, he was offered a scholarship at Michigan Technological University in Houghton, Michigan, USA specializing in an engineering double major starting 2010 while playing for the MTU Huskies basketball program playing in the GLIAC (GLIAC) in NCAA Division II.

In Lebanon
The Lebanese Basketball Federation invited Haidar for summer tryouts in June 2011. He was one of 25 players competing for 12 spots on the national team. He had his international debut playing in a regional tournament in Jordan, representing Lebanon.

Between 2013 and 2018, he played professionally in the Lebanese basketball club Sporting Al Riyadi Beirut. In 2018, he moved to play for Beirut Sports Club.

In season 2021–2022, he moved to Dynamo Beirut to reach the Final Four and went back to Beirut Club in season 2022-2023 having the chance to play in Al Wasl Tournament

References

1990 births
Living people
Basketball people from Ontario
Canadian expatriate basketball people in the United States
Canadian men's basketball players
Power forwards (basketball)
Lebanese emigrants to Canada
Lebanese men's basketball players
Michigan Tech Huskies men's basketball players
Place of birth missing (living people)
Saskatchewan Rattlers players
Small forwards
Al Riyadi Club Beirut basketball players
Sportspeople of Lebanese descent
Champville SC players